Until January 1, 2007, Blaabjerg (Danish: Blåbjerg - literally blue mountain) was a municipality (Danish, kommune) in Ribe County on the west coast of the Jutland peninsula in southwest Denmark. The municipality covered an area of 254 km2, and had a total population of 6,509 (2005). Its latest mayor was Preben Olesen. The site of its municipal council was the town of Nørre Nebel.

Blaabjerg municipality ceased to exist due to Kommunalreformen ("The Municipality Reform" of 2007). It was merged with the former Blåvandshuk, Helle, Varde, and Ølgod municipalities to form a new Varde municipality.

Blaabjerg and the city of Nørre Nebel is home to a landing station where multiple transatlantic telephone cable systems are terminated, including DANICE, CANTAT-3 and Havfrue (the latter replacing TAT-14 in end of 2020).

References

External links 
 Varde municipality's official website 
 Varde municipality's official tourist information website

Former municipalities of Denmark